Ralph Walters ( – 20 April 1865) was a British Liberal Member of Parliament.

After failing to be elected as an Independent Liberal candidate at Gateshead in 1852, Walters was elected Liberal MP for Beverley at the 1859 general election. However, just four months after his election, he was unseated due to bribery during campaigning.

References

External links
 

UK MPs 1859–1865
Liberal Party (UK) MPs for English constituencies
1800 births
1865 deaths
Year of birth uncertain